Infante Antonio, Duke of Galliera (Antonio Maria Luis Felipe Juan Florencio de Orleans y Borbón; 23 February 1866 – 24 December 1930), was a member of the Spanish and French royal families. He was the son of Antoine d'Orléans, Duke of Montpensier, and Infanta Luisa Fernanda of Spain. Infante Antonio was a grandson of King Louis Philippe I of France on his father's side and King Ferdinand VII of Spain on his mother's side.

Early life
Antonio was the only surviving son of Prince Antoine of Orléans, Duke of Montpensier, and his wife Infanta Luisa Fernanda of Spain. Through his father, he was a grandson of King Louis Philippe of the French and his wife Princess Maria Amalia of the Two Sicilies. Through his mother, he was a grandson of King Ferdinand VII of Spain and his wife Princess Maria Christina of the Two Sicilies.

Antonio was born in Seville, shortly before the end of the reign of his aunt Queen Isabella II of Spain. Due to the Glorious Revolution of 1868 which chased his family from Spain, he spent most of his childhood abroad. Yet his ambitious and liberal father Antoine, Duke of Montpensier, had some relations with the revolutionaries who forced him to flee his country of adoption. In fact, the uprising was prepared with his money and he hoped to be elected king in exchange. However, the attempt failed and the banishment of the House of Orléans was confirmed by the Spanish interim government.

In December 1874, the coup of General Arsenio Martínez Campos allowed for the restoration of the Spanish monarchy and the young Alfonso XII was made king following the renunciation of his mother. A few months later, the Orléans were pardoned and Antonio went to live with his family in Seville in Palacio San Telmo. In 1878, King Alfonso XII married Antonio's older sister Mercedes, and the reconciliation of the Spanish Orléans and Bourbons was complete.

Marriage
On 6 March 1886 in Madrid, Antonio married his cousin Infanta Eulalia of Spain, the daughter of Queen Isabella II of Spain and her husband Francis, Duke of Cádiz.
 
Antonio and Eulalia had two children:
 Alfonso, Infante of Spain and 5th Duke of Galliera (1886–1975);
 Luis Fernando, Infante of Spain (1888–1945);

Antonio's marriage gave him the opportunity to play some official role in the court in Madrid. In 1892, he participated in his wife's trip to Cuba and the United States for the celebrations of the 400th anniversary of the discovery of America by Christopher Columbus.  Antonio, however, was fickle and extravagant, while his wife was a strong and cultured woman who refused to bear the humiliations caused by her husband. They separated shortly after they returned to Spain from the United States.  On 31 May 1901, they signed a legal separation before the Spanish Consul General in Paris.

Duke of Galliera
In 1895, King Umberto I of Italy recognised Antonio as the heir of the title Duke of Galliera. The legitimate heir of the title, Philipp la Renotière von Ferrary (1850–1917) refused to use it and Antonio brought forward his relations with the family of the last Duchess of Galliera, Maria of Brignole-Sale (1812–1888) to obtain the title.

In 1900, Antonio met Marie-Louise Le Manac'h (1869–1949), widow of Simon Guggenheim (a Parisian businessman died in 1900, namesake of the American millionaire Simon Guggenheim), at the Savoy Hotel in London. Immediately seduced by the young Breton, Antonio began a new love affair, public in London, Paris and Seville. However, he could not remain faithful even to his mistress, and in 1906 he grew weary of the woman he had gradually introduced in the high society. Antonio was not able to come out of this relationship completely unharmed since his mistress, furious at being dismissed, broke a few of his teeth by hitting him with her umbrella.

Throughout these years, Antonio lived an expensive lifestyle and squandered the family fortune while his ex-wife lived in relative poverty. In 1919, his excessive spending forced him to sell his land in his Italian duchy.

Antonio died in comparative poverty in Paris in 1930.  His remains were transferred to the Pantheon of the Princes in El Escorial.

Arms

Ancestry

Notes

|- 

1866 births
1930 deaths
Princes of France (Orléans)
Spanish infantes
House of Orléans-Galliera
Dukes of Galliera
Burials in the Pantheon of Infantes at El Escorial
Knights of the Golden Fleece of Spain
Knights of the Order of Montesa